Marc Breeze (born 11 February 1987) is a Welsh rugby union player. A hooker, he played club rugby for the Cardiff Blues having previously played for Ospreys, London Welsh RFC, Aberavon RFC and Aberavon Quins RFC.

External links
 Cardiff Blues profile

1987 births
Living people
Cardiff Rugby players
London Welsh RFC players
Ospreys (rugby union) players
Rugby union players from Cwmavon, Neath Port Talbot
Welsh rugby union players
Rugby union hookers